The Afshar Operation was a military operation in Afghanistan that took place on February 11–12, 1993 during the Afghan Civil War (1992-96). The operation was launched by Ahmad Shah Massoud and Burhanuddin Rabbani's Islamic State of Afghanistan government and the allied Abdul Rasul Sayyaf's Ittehad-i Islami paramilitary forces against Gulbuddin Hekmatyar's Hezbe Islami and Abdul Ali Mazari's Hezbe Wahdat militias in the densely populated Afshar district in west Kabul. The Hazara-Hezbe Wahdat together with the Pashtun-Hezbe Islami of Hekmatyar had been shelling densely populated areas in northern Kabul from their positions in Afshar, killing thousands. To counter the shelling, government forces attacked Afshar in order to capture the positions of Wahdat and its leader Mazari, and to consolidate parts of the city controlled by the government.

The operation became an urban war zone and escalated into what is called the Afshar massacre when Sayyaf's Ittehad-i Islami forces and Massoud's Jamaat-e-Islami forces committed "repeated human butchery" turning against the Shia Muslims. Reports emerged that Sayyaf's Sunni Wahhabist forces backed by Saudi Arabia rampaged through Afshar, murdering and burning homes. Both the Hezb-e Wahdat and the Ittihad-i Islami had been involved in systematic abduction campaigns against civilians of the "opposite side", a pattern Ittihad continued in Afshar. Besides Ittihad commanders, two of the nine government commanders on the ground, Anwar Dangar (who later defected to the Taliban) and Mullah Izzat, were also named as leading troops that carried out abuses. Reports describe looting, indiscriminate shelling by Sayyaf's men and massacring of thousands of civilians from Hazara ethnic group. In one instance fleeing civilians in the streets were hit by fire from government soldiers. At the same time it was reported that in another incidence government troops carried a wounded Afshar civilian to safety and that some commanders on the ground tried to stop abuses from taking place.

The Islamic State's Defense Minister Ahmad Shah Massoud ordered an immediate halt to the crimes on the second day of the operation, but especially looting and the destruction of houses continued to take place for a second day. Massoud then appointed a Shia commander, Hussain Anwari, to ensure the safety of the Shia civilian population in Afshar. However Anwari himself became infamous for terrorizing Pashtun civilians, who were also raped and assaulted.

He also ordered the withdrawal of all offensive troops and persuaded Sayyaf to do the same. The Islamic State government in collaboration with the then enemy militia of Hezb-e Wahdat as well as in cooperation with Afshar civilians established a commission to investigate the crimes that had taken place in Afshar. The commission paid ransoms for approximately 80 to 200 people held by several Ittihad commanders. But 700-750 people abducted by Ittihad during the campaign were never returned however were later found to be alive and let go off randomly. About 20 were killed. The same commission received information that many women were abducted during the operation, but said that few families would report it. The Afshar operation proceeded with Massoud's approval, although he disapproved of Sayyaf's methods.

The Afshar operation, which saw hundreds of Sunni Pashtuns and Shia Hazaras systemically targeted and depopulated from villages in the area, was the first such sectarian oriented incident in Afghanistan's modern history. It is also considered to have been one of the worst single events in Afghanistan's wars.

Background and Objectives
On April 26, 1992, the mujahedin leaders announced a new peace and power-sharing agreement, the Peshawar Accords. During the period discussed in this article, the sovereignty of Afghanistan was vested formally in the "Islamic State of Afghanistan," an entity created in April 1992, after the fall of the Soviet-backed Najibu
lah government through the Peshawar Accords. The legitimate representatives of the government were President Burhanuddin Rabbani and minister of defense Ahmad Shah Massoud.

With the exception of Gulbuddin Hekmatyar's Hezb-i Islami which to a very large extent was controlled by the regime in Pakistan, all parties were ostensibly unified under this government in 1993. Hekmatyar shelled Kabul with tens of thousands of rockets in 1992 to gain power for himself. Hekmatyar repeatedly was offered the position of prime minister but he did not want to share power.

After failed attempts for negotiations a brutal war broke out between the Saudi-backed Ittihad-e-Islami of Abdul Rasul Sayyaf, the Jamiat-e-Islami of Ahmad Shah Massoud  and the Hezb-i Wahdat of Abdul Ali Mazari. According to Human Rights Watch numerous Iranian agents were assisting Wahdat forces, as Iran was attempting to maximize Wahdat's military power and influence in the new government. Saudi agents, private or governmental, were trying to strengthen Sayyaf and his Ittihad faction to the same end. Rare ceasefires commonly collapsed within days.

In December 1992 Abdul Ali Mazari's Wahdat entered in an alliance with Gulbuddin Hekmatyar.  With his newly created alliance with Hezb-i Wahdat, Hekmatyar increased his rockets and shell attacks on the city.  Human Rights Watch concludes:

The Afghanistan Justice Project gives the following objectives for the military operation:

Timeline

Preparation
According to a Human Rights Watch report, "credible and consistent" accounts from several officials who worked in Shura-e-Nazar (the informal politico-military organization headed by Rabbani's defense minister, Ahmad Shah Massoud) and the Rabbani interim government reveal that a military campaign against Hezb-i Wahdat was planned and approved by officials at the "highest levels" of the Rabbani government.

According to Afghanistan Justice Project although individual commanders cannot be identified, brigade and battalion leaders can be listed. For Jamiat, these include Qasim Fahim, Anwar Dangar, Mullah Ezat, Mohammad Ishaq Pashiri, Haji Bahlol Panshiri, Baba Jalandar Panjshiri, Khanjar Akhund Panshiri, Musdoq Lalai, and Baz Mohammad Ahmadi Badakhshani. From Ittihad these included Haji Shir Alam, Amir Anwar Oryakhail, Zulmai Tufan, Dr. Abdullah, Jaglan Naeem, Mullah Taj Mohammad, Abdullah Shah, Khinjar, Abdul Manan Diwana, Amanullah Kochi, Shirin, Mushtaq Lalai, and Mullah Kachkol.

By February 1993, Massoud had conducted negotiations with dissident Wahdat commanders who signed secret protocols with Massoud in order to avoid a long fight promising to cooperate during the conflict and to capture Mazari and his cabinet.

The Operation
The men of Mohammad Fahim, who was in charge of special operations, contacted a number of the Shia commanders and obtained their co-operation. This allowed the artillery to be pre-positioned in advance of the battle, with a ZU-23 gun and 30 men being positioned on Aliabad hill, with the purpose of targeting the Central Silo, Afshar, Kart-iSeh, Kart-iChar and Kart-I Sakhi. The forces allied with the government began to bomb the area around Afshar before troops began to move in around 4:00 am on February 11. Troops moved from Badambagh to the top of Radar hill, which was part of the Afshar ridge. According to Afghanistan Justice Project:

A large contingent of both Ittihad and Jamiat forces advanced towards Afshar from the west. The closest point of the front line to the main target of the operation was the Kabul Polytechnic. A Jamiat force advanced along the main Afshar Road, from Kart-iParwan and the Intercontinental Hotel, towards the Social Science Institute, entering Afshar from the east. The ISA forces did not advance along other sections of the front line marking the west Kabul enclave, although they maintained an intense bombardment and had ample forces deployed to maintain a threat of advance.

According to this, by 13:00 the main defense line of Hezb-I Wahdat had failed and the forces, including Mazari and his top commanders, began to flee on foot. By 14:00 the Social Science Institute was captured and troops were in control of Khushal Mina and Afshar.

Mazari re-established a defense line near the Central Silo and Kart-iSakhi, at the edge of Khushhal Mina, keeping control over most of West Kabul. Following this many of the residence fled to Taimani, an Ismali area of the city.

The objectives of the military operation were largely attained during the operation. Wahdat's headquarters and many of their positions were captured so that they were not able to shell Kabul from those positions anymore.

Crimes Against Civilians
Numerous abuses were reported and large information was collected through interviews by two separate reports – one by Afghanistan Justice Project and another by Human Rights Watch. The abuses largely took place after the military operation itself when forces started to establish posts and to search homes.

The vast majority of testimony regarding the Afshar operation suggests that the abuses were carried out by the Ittihad forces of Abdul Rasul Sayyaf and not the Jamiat forces of Ahmad Shah Massoud. Ittihad forces played a major role in the assault, working directly under Sayyaf and receiving pay from him. The Ittihad forces were not absorbed into the ministry of defense. Sayyaf acted as the de facto general commander of Ittihad forces during the operation and was directly in touch with senior commanders by radio.

According to reports, Wahdat soldiers as well as male Hazara citizens were being arrested and executed mostly by Ittihad forces. Unarmed civilians as well were being killed, with men in particular being targeted. Other men were abducted and taken to the base of Sayyaf's Ittihad in Paghman and made to dig trenches and bury the dead. Those who survived stated they saw on the bodies evidence of torture and mutilations. Human Rights Watch suggests that 70-80 people were killed in the streets fighting, while 700-750 people disappeared. It states that between 80 and 200 people were later released after ransoms were paid to Sayyaf's Ittihad commanders.

Proponents of the Rabbani government point to Wahdat's war crime committed against civilians as a legal pretext for the operation. In particular, the COUNCIL OF THE EUROPEAN UNION published a reporting that points to some of to most gruesome atrocity in west Kabul by Hezb-i-Wahdat.

Controversy
John Jennings, a journalist with the AP present in Afshar during the operation around Massoud's troops, went into considerable detail to debunk allegations of a systematic massacre of civilians. Although he did leave open the possibility that some captured Wahdat fighters were summarily executed rather than being treated as POWs by troops furious at Wahdat atrocities against Kabul civilians during the preceding months. Jennings recounts entering a nearby basement where Wahdat fighters had tied up non-Hazara hostages with wire, shot them and tried to burn the bodies, before fleeing the scene ahead of Massoud's advancing troops. Jennings also describes Ahmad Shah Massoud's followers rescuing a wounded Hazara civilian caught in the crossfire during the height of the battle. Despite these written reference — and although Jennings is quoted as a reliable source on other topics in the Human Rights Watch reports — any account of what he witnessed during and after the Afshar battle was left out by Human Rights Watch editors.

Islamabad Accord (March 1993)

The Afshar campaign and the surrounding violence were ended by the Islamabad Accord between the Islamic State and Hekmatyar's alliance (including Hezb-i Wahdat) fashioned in late February 1993 and signed on March 7, 1993. There were a few weeks of relative calm. Hezb-i Wahdat ally Gulbuddin Hekmatyar took the long-offered position of prime minister in the Rabbani government.

The Islamabad Accord among other things stated:

Pulitzer Prize-winning Roy Gutman of the United States Institute of Peace wrote in How We Missed the Story: Osama bin Laden, the Taliban, and the Hijacking of Afghanistan:

Hekmatyar turned out afraid to enter the city (he had shelled for one year) more than once to take up his post. He attended one cabinet meeting but by late March, unwilling to compromise with other cabinet members not belonging to his faction and while his aides were still in the prime minister's palace, Hekmatyar's Hezb-e Islami forces were again shelling Kabul.

See also
List of massacres in Afghanistan

References

Massacres in Afghanistan
Afghan Civil War (1992–1996)
1992 in Afghanistan
History of Kabul
Battles involving the Hazara people
Massacres of Hazara people
Persecution of Hazaras
Hazara people
February 1993 events in Asia